Damla may refer to:
 Damla (name), Turkish given name
Damla, Haryana, village in Yamunanagar district, Haryana, India
Damla, Araç, village in Araç District, Kastamonu Province, Turkey
Damla, Haryana, location of Krishi Vigyan Kendra, Damla agricultural centre in Haryana, India
Damla (brand), a Coca-Cola brand